Ryan Frederick Smeeton (born 26 October 1998) is a Canadian track and field athlete who specializes in the 3000 metres steeplechase. He has competed on two world teams; in the men's 3000 metres steeplechase at the World Athletics Championships held in Doha, Qatar and in the men's 3000 metres steeplechase at the World Athletics Championships held in Eugene, Oregon. He failed to qualify for either final.

In 2019, he competed in the men's 3000 metres steeplechase event at the Summer Universiade held in Naples, Italy. He also represented Canada at the 2019 Pan American Games held in Lima, Peru in the men's 3000 metres steeplechase event. He finished in 6th place.

References

External links 
 
 

Living people
1998 births
Place of birth missing (living people)
Canadian male middle-distance runners
Canadian male steeplechase runners
World Athletics Championships athletes for Canada
Athletes (track and field) at the 2019 Pan American Games
Pan American Games track and field athletes for Canada
Competitors at the 2019 Summer Universiade
Oklahoma State Cowboys track and field athletes
21st-century Canadian people